Cerianthus is a genus of tube-dwelling anemones in the family Cerianthidae. Members of the genus are found worldwide. They are predators, scavengers and omnivores.

Characteristics
Members of this genus do not have a pedal disc with which to hold themselves in position. Instead they live semi-buried in soft substrate surrounded by a parchment-like tube which they secrete. This surrounds the whole anemone up to its crown of tentacles. Sand grains, debris and shell fragments usually stick to the outer side of the tube. When it is disturbed, the anemone retracts swiftly back into the tube. The longitudinal muscles in the trunk are powerful but the transverse ones are weak. The outer ring of tentacles are long and tapering. The tube is flexible and the anemone can extend its tentacles a surprisingly long way. The inner ring of tentacles surrounds the central mouth and assists in pushing food inside.

Species
The following species are currently included in the genus according to the World Register of Marine Species:

 Cerianthus bathymetricus Mosley, 1877
 Cerianthus brasiliensis Mello-Leitão, 1919
 Cerianthus filiformis Carlgren, 1893
 Cerianthus incertus Roule, 1904
 Cerianthus japonicus Carlgren, 1924
 Cerianthus lloydii Gosse, 1859
 Cerianthus malakhovi Molodtsova, 2001
 Cerianthus membranaceus (Spallanzani, 1784)
 Cerianthus mortenseni Carlgren, 1924
 Cerianthus punctatus Uchida, 1979
 Cerianthus roulei Carlgren, 1912
 Cerianthus sulcatus Kwietniewski, 1898
 Cerianthus taedus McMurrich, 1910
 Cerianthus valdiviae Carlgren, 1912
 Cerianthus vogti Danielssen, 1890

References

Taxa named by Stefano delle Chiaje
Cerianthidae
Anthozoa genera